Ecole et Collège Saint-Mauront is a private Catholic primary and junior high school in the 3rd arrondissement, Marseille, France. It is under the jurisdiction of the Diocese of Marseille.

History
It opened in a former soap factory in 1905. Initially its student body was majority ethnic French, and Italians and Portuguese were students in the period prior to 1938. Beginning in the 1960s children from former colonies in sub-Saharan Africa enrolled as students.

Demographics
 the school had 117 students, with 85-90% of them being of recent immigrant origin. Katrin Bennhold of The New York Times stated in 2008 that few of the students were white.

As of 2011 he majority of the students were Muslim. Circa 2008 Muslims made up about 80% of the students.

In 2011 the school had 17 teachers.

Curriculum
In order to discourage students from going to Quranic classes held in mosques, the school offers its own optional Arabic courses; it has done so since circa 2006. The school does this to prevent Islamic extremism.

The school teaches evolution; in 2008 headmaster Jean Chamoux stated that some Muslim students try to refute the teaching of evolution.

School regulations
 students are allowed to wear hijab, something not permitted in French state schools.

In 2008 Chamoux stated that many Muslim parents ask for exemptions from swimming courses for female students and provide medical exemption documentation if the school refuses the initial exemption request.

References

External links
 Ecole et Collège Saint-Mauront 

3rd arrondissement of Marseille
Catholic elementary and primary schools in France
Schools in Marseille
1905 establishments in France
Educational institutions established in 1905
Catholic secondary schools in France